List of notable events in music that took place in the year 1970.



Specific locations
1970 in British music
1970 in Norwegian music

Specific genres
1970 in country music
1970 in heavy metal music
1970 in jazz

Events 
January 3 – Ex-Pink Floyd frontman Syd Barrett releases his first solo album The Madcap Laughs.
January 4 – The Who drummer Keith Moon fatally runs over his chauffeur with his Bentley trying to escape a mob outside a pub. The death is later ruled an accident.
January 7 – Max Yasgur, owner of the Bethel, New York farm where the 1969 Woodstock Festival was held, is sued for $35,000 in property damages by neighboring farmers.
January 9 – Led Zeppelin performs at The Royal Albert Hall. John Bonham plays a fifteen-minute rendition of "Moby Dick".
January 14 – Diana Ross and the Supremes perform for the last time together at the Frontier Hotel in Las Vegas.
January 16 – John Lennon's London art gallery exhibit of lithographs, Bag One, is shut down by Scotland Yard for displaying "erotic lithographs".
January 24 – James "Shep" Sheppard, of The Heartbeats and Shep and the Limelites, is found murdered in his car on the Long Island Expressway.
January 26 – Simon & Garfunkel release their final album together, Bridge Over Troubled Water. The title track and album stay #1 on the Billboard charts for six weeks and go on to win a record six Grammys at the 13th Grammy Awards, including "Record of the Year", "Song of the Year", and "Album of the Year." In Britain it tops the album chart at regular intervals over the next two years, and becomes the best-selling album in Britain during the 1970s.
January 27 – Miles Davis makes the final recordings for his experimental album Circle in the Round, featuring sitar and tabla.
January 28 – The newly formed Band of Gypsies breaks up when guitarist Jimi Hendrix walks out after playing just two songs, telling the audience "I'm sorry we just can't get it together".
February 11 – The film The Magic Christian, starring Peter Sellers and Ringo Starr, is premiered in New York City. The film's soundtrack album, including Badfinger's "Come and Get It" (written and produced by Paul McCartney), is released on Apple Records.
February 13 – English band Black Sabbath release their self titled debut album in the U.K., credited as the first major album in the heavy metal genre.
February 14 – The Who records Live At Leeds in Yorkshire, England. The Grateful Dead plays an equally historic concert on the same date at the Fillmore East, New York City.
February 17 – Joni Mitchell announces that she is retiring from live performances, following her show at London's Royal Albert Hall. She would be back performing concerts within a year.
February 23 – Ringo Starr appears on the television show Rowan & Martin's Laugh-In.
February 27 – Jefferson Airplane is fined $1,000 for using profanity during a concert in Oklahoma City, Oklahoma.
February 28 – Elvis Presley performed at the Houston Astrodome. The King of Rock and Roll broke previous attendance records with a crowd of 36,299 - which was 10,000 more than the previous record.
February 28 – Led Zeppelin perform in Copenhagen under the pseudonym The Nobs, to avoid a threatened lawsuit by Count Eva von Zeppelin, descendant of airship designer Ferdinand von Zeppelin.
March 4 – Janis Joplin is fined $200 for using obscene language during a concert performance in Tampa, Florida.
March 6 – Cult leader and suspected murderer Charles Manson releases an album titled Lie: The Love and Terror Cult to help finance his defense.
March 7 – Mountain, one of the many bands credited as having influence in the development of heavy metal music, releases Climbing!, their debut album.
March 11 – The 12th Annual Grammy Awards are presented in Chicago, Los Angeles, Nashville, New York and Atlanta. Blood, Sweat & Tears' self-titled album wins Album of the Year, The 5th Dimension's "Aquarius/Let the Sunshine In" wins Record of the Year and Joe South's "Games People Play" wins Song of the Year. Crosby, Stills & Nash win Best New Artist.
March 15 – West German pavilion at Expo '70 in Osaka features 5½ hours' daily live performances of the music of Karlheinz Stockhausen (to September 13).
March 19 – David Bowie marries model Angela Barnett.
March 21 – In Amsterdam, Dana wins the 15th annual Eurovision Song Contest for Ireland with the song All Kinds of Everything. She is elected to the European Parliament some 29 years later.
March 25 – José José gives a masterful performance of the song "El Triste" at the "Latin Song Festival II", predecessor of the OTI Festival.
March 26 – Peter Yarrow (of Peter, Paul and Mary) pleads guilty to "taking immoral liberties" with a 14-year-old girl in Washington, D.C., on August 31, 1969.
April 2 – The London Magistrate's Court hears arguments on John Lennon's indecency summons for his exhibition of erotic lithographs during his art exhibit on January 16.
April 3 – Minneapolis nightclub the Depot opens, eventually renamed to First Avenue.
April 10 – Paul McCartney publicly announces that he has left The Beatles in a press release, written in mock-interview style, that is included in promotional copies of his first solo album and headlined in the Daily Mirror newspaper in the United Kingdom.
April 14 – Michael Nesmith announces he has left The Monkees.
April 17 – Johnny Cash performs at the White House at the invitation of President Richard M. Nixon.
April 20 – Paul McCartney's first solo album, McCartney, is released.
April 24 – Grace Slick of Jefferson Airplane is invited to a tea party at the White House by Tricia Nixon, daughter of U.S. President Richard Nixon. Slick arrives at the party with Abbie Hoffman, who is on trial for conspiring to riot at the 1968 Democratic National Convention. The pair planned to spike Nixon's tea cup with a heavy dose of LSD. Slick is recognized (although Hoffman is not) and told to leave because she is on the FBI list.
May 4 – Charles Wuorinen, 32, becomes the youngest composer ever to win the Pulitzer Prize for Music.
May 8 – The Beatles' last LP, Let It Be, is released.
May 16 
Randy Bachman leaves the Guess Who to start up Brave Belt.
The Who release Live at Leeds which is their first live album. Since its initial reception, Live at Leeds has been cited by several music critics as the best live rock recording of all time.
May 20 – The Beatles' film Let It Be premières in London and Liverpool.  None of the four band members are present at either screening.
May 23–24 – Grateful Dead make their first British appearance at Hollywood Festival, Newcastle-under-Lyme, on a bill also featuring Black Sabbath, Free, and José Feliciano. Everyone is completely upstaged by the previously unknown Mungo Jerry, whose debut single "In the Summertime" becomes the best-selling hit of the year.
June – Australian composer Peter Sculthorpe receives the MBE in the Queen's Birthday Honours.
June 3 – The Kinks singer Ray Davies makes a 6000-mile round trip from New York to London and back- interrupting the band's American tour- to re-record one word on their latest single "Lola". In order to get any airplay in Great Britain he has to change the word "Coca-Cola" to a more subtle "cherry cola".
June 7 – The Who play two shows of Tommy, at the New York Metropolitan Opera House. 
June 13
"The Long and Winding Road" becomes the Beatles' last U.S. Number 1 song, though it is never released as a single in Britain.
The Stooges play at the Cincinnati Pop Festival, Midsummer Rock.
July 4 – The music countdown show American Top 40 debuts.
July 17 – The Guess Who perform at the White House for President Nixon and his guest the Prince of Wales (now Charles III). At Pat Nixon's request, they do not play their breakthrough hit "American Woman" due to the song's supposed anti-American lyrics.
July 26 – Guitarist Jimi Hendrix plays at his hometown of Seattle at Sicks Stadium where, under the influence of drugs, he starts verbally abusing members of the audience.
August 3 – Janis Joplin makes her final TV appearance, on the Dick Cavett Show.
August 26–30 – The Isle of Wight Festival 1970 takes place on East Afton Farm off the coast of England. Some 600,000 people attend the largest rock festival of all time. Artists include The Moody Blues, Jimi Hendrix, The Who, The Doors, Chicago, Leonard Cohen, Miles Davis, Richie Havens, John Sebastian, Joan Baez, Ten Years After, Emerson, Lake & Palmer and Jethro Tull.
August 30 – The Rolling Stones open their European tour in Malmö, Sweden.
September 6 – During his final European tour, guitarist Jimi Hendrix is greeted by booing and jeering by German fans as a result of his late appearance on stage and incoherent stage performance. Bassist Billy Cox quits the tour and returns to the United States.
September 17 – Jimi Hendrix makes his last appearance, with Eric Burdon & War jamming at Ronnie Scotts Club in London. Hendrix, aged 27, dies the following day from a barbiturate overdose at his London hotel.
October 4 – Janis Joplin is found dead in her bedroom in the Landmark Motor Hotel in Hollywood. She died from a heroin overdose, at the age of 27.
October 10 – Newly independent Fiji adopts God Bless Fiji as its national anthem.
October 30 – Jim Morrison of The Doors, found guilty of indecent exposure and profanity because of his behavior during a March 1, 1969, concert, is sentenced to eight months of hard labor and a $500 fine.
November 9 – The blues rock studio double album Layla and Other Assorted Love Songs, the only album by Derek and the Dominos, is released, initially in the United States, the first presentation of the classic title track, "Layla", by English guitarist Eric Clapton and American drummer Jim Gordon.
November 12 – After Yehudi Menuhin accepts honorary citizenship from Switzerland, he receives a letter from the United States State Department telling him that both he and his son will lose their US citizenship as a result.
November 20 – The Kinks singer Ray Davies flies to a London studio to re-record one word in a new Kinks single for the second time in 1970. This time, he has to change a line in "Apeman"- "The air pollution is a-foggin' up my eyes" which sounds too much like "a-fuckin'".
November 23 – The Electric Factory concert venue in Philadelphia, Pennsylvania' closes its doors.
December 8 – John Lennon conducts a lengthy and intensely candid interview with Jann Wenner of Rolling Stone magazine. He discusses his new solo album and the influence of primal therapy on its creation, as well as his personal traumas dating back to childhood. He also makes many revelations about his time in The Beatles, including his account of the group's breakup.
December 12 – The Doors play their final concert with singer Jim Morrison at The Warehouse in New Orleans, Louisiana. After the concert The Doors decide that they will not play live anymore due to Morrison's unpredictable live persona.
December 31
 The Beatles officially and finally split up after 10 years.

Bands formed 
See Musical groups established in 1970

Bands disbanded 
 The Beatles break up permanently.
 The Nice disband. 
 Bonzo Dog Doo-Dah Band split, with reunions in 1972, 1988, and 2006.
 Simon & Garfunkel – both members of the duo go on to solo careers, although they have reunited and performed together numerous times since breaking up.
 The Turtles (reform in 1983)
 Dave Clark 5 Many members would leave and new members formed 'Dave Clark & Friends' which lasted until 1973.
See also Musical groups disestablished in 1970

Albums released 

In 1970, 4,000 albums and 5,700 singles were released in the US.

January

February

March

April

May

June

July

August

September

October

November

December

Release date unknown

 3 Shades of Blue - Johnny Hodges
 4 Compositions for Sextet – Tony Oxley
 Affenstunde - Popol Vuh
 Afternoon of a Georgia Faun - Marion Brown
 Again – Oliver
 Alive! - Grant Green
 Andy Williams' Greatest Hits – Andy Williams 
 The Andy Williams Show – Andy Williams 
 The Awakening - Ahmad Jamal
 Back Home – Chuck Berry
 Band of Gold - Freda Payne
 Barrel – Lee Michaels
 The Big O – Roy Orbison
 Black Gold – Nina Simone
 Black on Black! - Sonny Phillips
 Bless Her Heart...I Love Her - Hank Locklin 
 Both Sides Now - Willie Nelson
 Bright Sun Is Shining – Barry Melton
 Bruce Cockburn - Bruce Cockburn
 The Candlestickmaker - Ron Elliott
 Canned Heat '70 Concert Live in Europe - Canned Heat
 Canto libre – Víctor Jara
 Christine Perfect - Christine McVie
 Come On Down! - Eddie Harris
 Consciousness! - Eric Kloss 
 Consummation - The Thad Jones/Mel Lewis Orchestra
 Copperfields – The Dillards
 Country and West - Dottie West
 Cowboy in Sweden – Lee Hazlewood
 Demon's Dance - Jackie McLean
 Doris Troy - Doris Troy
 Down to Earth – Jimmy Buffett
 Drives - Lonnie Smith
 Earth Rot - David Axelrod
 East Bay Grease - Tower of Power
 Eastwood Rides Again - The Upsetters
 Ebony Woman - Billy Paul
 Elastic Rock - Nucleus
 Electric Byrd - Donald Byrd
 The Electric Lucifer - Bruce Haack
 El Triste – José José
 Empty Rooms - John Mayall
 Entrance – Edgar Winter
 Everything I Play Is Funky - Lou Donaldson
 Fancy - Bobbie Gentry
 Fancy Free - Donald Byrd
 Fanny - Fanny
 Fat Mattress II - Fat Mattress
 Five Bridges - The Nice
 Flamingo - Flamin' Groovies
 Flat Baroque and Berserk – Roy Harper
 Fools – Kenny Rogers and The First Edition
 Focus Plays Focus – Focus
 Friend's Friend's Friend - Audience
 Glass Harp - Glass Harp
 Golden Earring - Golden Earring
 Good-byes and Butterflies – Five Man Electrical Band
 Good Vibes - The Natural Four
 Gravy Train - Gravy Train
 Greatest Hits - Phil Ochs
 Green Is Beautiful - Grant Green
 A Groovy Situation - Reuben Wilson
 Gula Matari – Quincy Jones
 Gypsy - Gypsy
 Here Comes Shuggie Otis - Shuggie Otis
 Here It 'Tis - Johnny "Hammond" Smith
 Hey America - James Brown
 High Tide - High Tide
 Honey Come Back - Patti Page
 Honey, Wheat and Laughter – Anne Murray
 It'll All Work Out in Boomland - T2
 I Am the Blues - Willie Dixon
 I'll Never Fall in Love Again - Dionne Warwick
 In Concert at the Troubadour, 1969 – Ricky Nelson
 Intensified – Desmond Dekker & the Aces
 Iron Mountain Depot - John Hartford
 Joe Farrell Quartet - Joe Farrell
 The Jumpin' Blues - Dexter Gordon
 King Kong: Jean-Luc Ponty Plays the Music of Frank Zappa - Jean-Luc Ponty
 King of the Delta Blues Singers, Vol. II – Robert Johnson 
 Klopfzeichen – Kluster
 The Last Poets - The Last Poets
 Laying My Burdens Down - Willie Nelson
 Liberation Music Orchestra - Charlie Haden
 Legal – Gal Costa
 Lie Back and Enjoy It – Juicy Lucy
 Live on Blueberry Hill - Led Zeppelin
 Lorca - Tim Buckley
 Loretta Lynn Writes 'Em & Sings 'Em – Loretta Lynn

 Loudon Wainwright III – Loudon Wainwright III
 Love Country Style - Ray Charles
 Lucifer's Friend – Lucifer's Friend
 Magma - Magma
 Magnetic South - Michael Nesmith
 Manal – Manal
 Manfred Mann Chapter Three Volume Two - Manfred Mann Chapter Three
 Marrying Maiden - It's a Beautiful Day
 Mashmakhan - Mashmakhan
 Masterpiece - The Masters Apprentices
 May Blitz - May Blitz
 Me & Jerry - Chet Atkins and Jerry Reed
 Melody Fair - Lulu
 Mona - The Carnivorous Circus - Mick Farren
 Moog Indigo - Jean-Jacques Perrey
 Morning Way - Trader Horne
 Mountains - Steamhammer
 Muscle Shoals Nitty Gritty - Herbie Mann
 Music Inspire by Lord of the Rings - Bo Hansson
 Natural Resources - Martha and the Vandellas
 The New Birth - New Birth
 New Routes - Lulu
 Nicely Out of Tune - Lindisfarne
 No BS - Brownsville Station
 Now I'm a Woman - Nancy Wilson
 Only for the Lonely - Mavis Staples
 Open Road – Donovan
 Parallelograms - Linda Perhacs
 The Partridge Family Album – The Partridge Family
 Patto - Patto
 Perry Como in Person at the International Hotel, Las Vegas – Perry Como
 Pretty Things - Lou Donaldson
 Primordial Lovers - Essra Mohawk
 Ptah, the El Daoud - Alice Coltrane
 Raindrops Keep Fallin' on My Head – Andy Williams 
 Raw Sienna - Savoy Brown
 Real Friends - The Friends of Distinction
 Red Clay - Freddie Hubbard
 Revolution – The Dubliners
 The Return of The Marvelettes - The Marvelettes
 Rick Sings Nelson – Ricky Nelson
 Right On – Wilson Pickett
 The Road to Ruin - John Martyn and Beverley Martyn
 Rock Festival – The Youngbloods
 Rose Garden – Lynn Anderson
 Runt - Todd Rundgren
 The Rubaiyat of Dorothy Ashby - Dorothy Ashby
 Sacrifice - Black Widow
 Seatrain – Seatrain
 Small Talk at 125th and Lenox – Gil Scott-Heron – Live
 Snowbird – Anne Murray 
 Something's Burning – Kenny Rogers and The First Edition
 Soul Liberation - Rusty Bryant
 Spaces - Larry Coryell 
 Stone Flute - Herbie Mann
 Stoned Guitar - The Human Instinct
 Stonehenge – Richie Havens
 Stormbringer! - John Martyn and Beverley Martyn
 Subway to the Country - David Ackles
 Sugarloaf – Sugarloaf
 Take Me to Tomorrow - John Denver
 Tammy's Touch - Tammy Wynette
 Tap Root Manuscript – Neil Diamond 
 Tarkio - Brewer & Shipley
 Tell It All Brother – Kenny Rogers and The First Edition
 Them Changes - Buddy Miles
 Things Ain't What They Used to Be (And You Better Believe It) – Ella Fitzgerald
 Things We Like - Jack Bruce
 Think Pink - Twink
 Tide – Antonio Carlos Jobim
 The Time Is Near - Keef Hartley
 Tin Tin - Tin Tin
 To Bonnie from Delaney - Delaney & Bonnie
 Toe Fat - Toe Fat
 Tommy James - Tommy James
 Ton-Ton Macoute! - Johnny Jenkins
 Tony Joe – Tony Joe White
 Trapeze – Trapeze
 Transition - John Coltrane
 A Tribute to the Best Damn Fiddle Player in the World (or, My Salute to Bob Wills) – Merle Haggard
 Turn It Over - The Tony Williams Lifetime
 USA Union – John Mayall
 The Use of Ashes - Pearls Before Swine
 Very Dionne - Dionne Warwick
 Warpig – Warpig
 We Went to Different Schools Together – the Jaggerz
 Whales & Nightingales - Judy Collins
 The Whispers - The Whispers
 Willard - John Stewart
 Wilson Pickett in Philadelphia - Wilson Pickett
 Yeti – Amon Düül II

Billboard Top popular records of 1970

from Billboard December 26, 1970 - Record Talent Edition pg TA-30

"Top Records OF 1970 (Based on Billboard's Charts)
The information compiled for the Top Records of 1970 is based on the weekly chart positioning and length of time records were on the respective charts from the
Billboard issue dates of January 3 through November 28, 1970. These recaps, as well as the weekly charts, do not reflect actual sales figures. The ratings take into
account the number of weeks the disk was on the chart, plus the weekly positions it held during its chart life. Each disk was given points accordingly for its respective
chart, and in addition, the No. 1 disk each week was assigned bonus points equal to the total number of positions on its respective chart. 

Unfortunately, Billboard's late December print deadline prevented approximately 60 records from completing their full chart runs, and their formula also included approximately 50 records from 1969, some of which had enough points to rank in the 1970 chart. Joel Whitburn's Records Research books, archived issues of Billboard for November-December 1969 and December 1970-March 1971, and Hot 100 Year-End formulas were used to complete the December 26 year-end chart reprinted here. 

The completed chart is composed of records that entered the Billboard Hot 100 during November-December 1969 (only when the majority of chart weeks were in 1970), January to November-December 1970 (majority of chart weeks in 1970). Records with majority of chart weeks in 1969 or 1971 are included in the year-end charts for those years, respectively, and multiple appearances are not permitted. Each week fifteen points were awarded to the number one record, then nine points for number two, eight points for number three, and so on. The total points a record earned determined its year-end rank. The complete chart life of each record is represented, with number of points accrued. There are no ties, even when multiple records have the same number of points. The next ranking category is peak chart position, then weeks at peak chart position, weeks in top ten, weeks in top forty, and finally weeks on Hot 100 chart.

The chart can be sorted by Artist, Song title, Recording and Release dates, Cashbox year-end ranking (CB) or units sold (sales) by clicking on the column header. Additional details for each record can be accessed by clicking on the song title, and referring to the Infobox in the right column of the song page. Billboard also has chart summaries on its website. Cashbox rankings were derived by same process as the Billboard rankings. Sales information was derived from the RIAA's Gold and Platinum database, the BRIT Certified database  and The Book of Golden Discs, but numbers listed should be regarded as estimates. Grammy Hall of Fame and National Recording Registry information with sources can be found on Wikipedia. 

Top 40 Chart hit singles

Other Chart hit singles

 Published popular songs 
 "An American Trilogy" medley written & arranged by Mickey Newbury
 "Bein' Green" w.m. Joe Raposo, from the TV series Sesame Street "Have You Ever Seen the Rain?" w.m. John C. Fogerty
 "I Love youuuuuu" w.m. Jeff Moss, from the TV series Sesame Street "If Not For You" w.m. Bob Dylan
 "Kentucky Rain" w.m. Eddie Rabbitt & Dick Heard
 "The Ladies Who Lunch" w.m. Stephen Sondheim. Introduced by Elaine Stritch in the musical Company.
 "Lookin' out My Back Door" w.m. John C. Fogerty
 "People in Your Neighborhood" w.m. Jeff Moss, from the TV series Sesame Street "Rubber Duckie" w.m. Jeff Moss, from the TV series Sesame Street "Teach Your Children" w.m. Graham Nash
 "(They Long to Be) Close to You" w. Hal David m. Burt Bacharach
 "Who'll Stop the Rain" w.m. John C. Fogerty
 "Where Do I Begin" (Love Story) – w. Carl Sigman, m. Francis Lai

 Classical music 
 Sir Arthur Bliss – Concerto for Cello and Orchestra
 George Crumb
 Ancient Voices of Children for mezzo-soprano, boy soprano, oboe, mandolin, harp, amplified piano (and toy piano), and percussion (three players)
 Black Angels (Images I) for electric string quartet
 Mario Davidovsky – Synchronisms No. 6 for piano and electronic sound
 Charles Dodge – Earth's Magnetic Field Henri Dutilleux – Figures de résonances for two pianos
 Morton FeldmanMadame Press Died Last Week at NinetyThe Viola in My Life 1, 2 and 3
 Luc Ferrari – Presque rien No. 1 "Le Lever du jour au bord de la mer" Miloslav Kabeláč – Symphony No. 8 "Antiphonies"
 György Ligeti – ContinuumWitold Lutosławski – Concerto for Cello and Orchestra 
 Olivier Messiaen – La Fauvette des Jardins Allan Pettersson – Symphony No. 9
 Poul Ruders – Piano Sonata No. 1
 Karlheinz StockhausenExpo for three players with short-wave radios, and sound projectionistMantra for two pianos and live electronicsPole for two players with short-wave radios, and sound projectionist

 Opera 
 Herman D. Koppel – MacbethJazz

 Musical theater 
 1776, London production
 Applause (book: Betty Comden & Adolph Green, lyrics: Lee Adams, music: Charles Strouse) – Broadway production opened at the Palace Theater and ran for 896 performances
 The Boy Friend (Sandy Wilson) – Broadway revival
 Cabaret (Kander and Ebb) – Vienna production
 Company (Stephen Sondheim) – Broadway production opened at the Alvin Theater and ran for 705 performances
 Dames at Sea, Broadway revival
 Georgy, Broadway production opened at the Winter Garden Theater and ran for four performances
 Golden Bat Off-Broadway production opened at the Sheridan Square Playhouse on July 21 and ran for 152 performances
 The Great Waltz, London production
 Look to the Lilies (Jule Styne and Sammy Cahn) – Broadway production opened at the Lunt-Fontanne Theatre and ran for 25 performances
 The Me Nobody Knows, started as an off-Broadway production, then moved to Broadway, where it ran for 378 performances
 Minnie's Boys, Broadway production opened at the Imperial Theatre and ran for 80 performances
 Purlie, Broadway production opened at The Broadway Theatre and ran for 688 performances
 The Rothschilds (book: Sherman Yellen, lyrics: Sheldon Harnick, music: Jerry Bock), Broadway production opened at the Lunt-Fontanne Theatre on October 19 and ran for 507 performances.  Starring Hal Linden, Jill Clayburgh and Paul Hecht.
 Two by Two, Broadway production opened at the Imperial Theatre and ran for 351 performances

 Musical films 
 The Aristocats, animated feature film with the voices of Phil Harris, Eva Gabor, Thurl Ravenscroft, Hermione Baddeley and Sterling Holloway
 Darling Lili, starring Julie Andrews, Rock Hudson, Lance Percival and Jeremy Kemp
 Dastak, Hindi film starring Sanjeev Kumar
 Johny Mera Naam, Hindi film starring Dev Anand and Pran
 Let It Be, a documentary film featuring The Beatles
 On a Clear Day You Can See Forever starring Barbra Streisand, Yves Montand and Bob Newhart
 Peau d'Âne, starring Catherine Deneuve and Jean Marais, with music by Michel Legrand
 Scrooge, starring Albert Finney, Alec Guinness, Kenneth More, Suzanne Neve and Anton Rodgers
 Song of Norway, starring Toralv Maurstad, Florence Henderson and Harry Secombe.
 Woodstock, a documentary film featuring Jimi Hendrix, The Who, Jefferson Airplane, Canned Heat and others

 Births 
January  – Frank Mullen, American rock singer (Suffocation)
January 2
Eric Whitacre, composer
Karen Kamensek, orchestra conductor
January 9
Carl Bell, American singer-songwriter, guitarist, and producer
Lara Fabian, Canadian-Belgian singer
Mia X, rapper
Alex Staropoli, Italian keyboard player and songwriter
January 12
Zack de la Rocha (Rage Against the Machine)
Raekwon, rapper
January 18 – DJ Quik, rapper and record producer
January 20 – Edwin McCain, American singer-songwriter and guitarist
January 23 – Brendan O'Connor, Irish singer and television host
January 26 – Kirk Franklin, gospel singer
January 27 – Mark Trojanowski (Sister Hazel)
January 31 
Minnie Driver, English singer-songwriter and actress
Danny Michel, Canadian singer-songwriter and producer
February 18 
Susan Egan, American actress and singer
Raine Maida, Canadian musician and beat poet
February 26 – Linda Brava, Finnish violinist
February 28 – Daniel Handler, accordionist and arranger (The Magnetic Fields)
March 1 – Jason V Brock, American author, filmmaker, artist, scholar and musician 
March 5 – John Frusciante, American guitarist, singer, producer and composer (Red Hot Chili Peppers)
March 7 – Vladislav Adelkhanov, Georgian classical violinist and writer
March 9
La India, salsa singer
 Shannon Leto, American drummer and songwriter (Thirty Seconds to Mars)
 March 12 – Roy Khan, Norwegian singer-songwriter 
March 17 – Gene Ween, guitarist and vocalist (Ween)
March 18 – Queen Latifah, American rapper, singer and actress
March 21 – Jaya, Filipino singer and television personality
March 24 – Sharon Corr, Irish musician
March 25 – Teri Moïse, American singer
March 27
Brendan Hill, drummer (Blues Traveler)
April 4 – Sean Kelly, Canadian guitarist
April 5 – Miho Hatori, Japanese singer and songwriter (Cibo Matto)
April 6 – Joe Gittleman, guitarist (The Mighty Mighty Bosstones)
April 10
 Mike Mushok, guitarist (Staind)
 Q-Tip, rapper
April 11 – Delroy Pearson, British singer (Five Star)
April 12 – Nick Hexum, American singer and guitarist
April 13
Eduardo Capetillo, Mexican actor and singer
Seagram, American rapper (d. 1996)
April 14 – Shizuka Kudo, Japanese singer and actress
April 17 – Redman, rapper
April 18 – Greg Eklund, American rock drummer (Everclear)
April 19 – Luis Miguel, Mexican singer
April 20 
 Phife Dawg, rapper
 Sarantuya, Mongolian soprano
April 22 – Regine Velasquez, Filipino singer, actress, model and record producer
April 26 – Tionne "T-Boz" Watkins, singer and songwriter TLC
May 1 – Sacha Perry, American jazz pianist and composer
May 4 – Gregg Alexander, American singer, songwriter and producer (New Radicals)
May 5 – Driss El Maloumi, Moroccan oud player and composer
May 9 – Ghostface Killah, American rapper
May 10 
Perry Blake, Irish singer-songwriter
Craig Mack, American rapper (d. 2018)
May 15 – Attrell Cordes (P.M. Dawn)
May 17 – Jordan Knight, American singer (New Kids on the Block)
May 18 – Billy Howerdel, guitarist, songwriter and producer (A Perfect Circle)
June 2 – B-Real, rapper (Cypress Hill)
June 3 – Peter Tägtgren, Swedish musician (Hypocrisy)
June 6 – James Shaffer, musician
June 8 – Seu Jorge, Brazilian pop samba singer=songwriter
June 10 – Mike Doughty, American singer
June 13 
 Cheryl "Coko" Clemons, American singer
 Rivers Cuomo, American singer, guitarist and songwriter (Weezer)
June 15 – Claus Norreen, Danish musician and record producer (Aqua)
June 17 – Sasha Sokol, Mexican singer
June 19
MJ Hibbett, English singer-songwriter
Brian Welch, American singer-songwriter and guitarist (Korn and Love and Death)
June 20 – Jason Robert Brown, American playwright and composer
June 21 
Eric Reed, American pianist and composer (Black Note)
Pete Rock, American rapper and producer (Pete Rock & CL Smooth)
June 22 – Steven Page, Canadian singer and songwriter (Barenaked Ladies)
June 23 
 Christian Meier, Peruvian actor and singer
 Yann Tiersen, Breton musician
June 24 
 Glenn Medeiros, American singer
 Andres Raag, Estonian actor and singer
June 25 – Roope Latvala, Finnish guitarist
July 4 – Christian Giesler, American bass player (Kreator)
July 6 – Harald Nævdal (Demonaz Doom Occulta), Norwegian musician 
July 8 – Beck, American singer, songwriter, rapper, record producer, and multi-instrumentalist
July 10
Gary LeVox, American singer
Jason Orange, British singer (Take That)
July 12 – Juba Kalamka, American rapper (Deep Dickollective)
July 14 – Thomas Lauderdale, American pianist (Pink Martini)
July 15 – Chi Cheng (musician), American rock bassist
July 18 – Gruff Rhys, Welsh musician, composer, producer, filmmaker and author
July 19 – Sandee Chan, Taiwanese singer
July 26 – Joan As Police Woman (Joan Wasser), American singer-songwriter
August 3 – Itamar Golan, Israeli pianist
August 11 – Andy Bell, British bassist, guitarist, singer-songwriter, and producer
August 19 – Joseph Cartagena (Fat Joe), American rapper
August 23 – River Phoenix, American actor and singer of Aleka's Attic (d. 1993)
August 24 – Kristyn Robyn Osborn, American country singer (SHeDAISY)
August 28 – Sherrié Austin, Australian actress and singer
August 30 – Guang Liang, Malaysian singer
August 31 
 Debbie Gibson, American singer-songwriter
 Epic Mazur, American vocalist, rapper, and record producer
September 4 – Daisy Dee, Dutch singer
September 5 – Liam Lynch, songwriter and music video director
September 6
 Cheyne Coates, Australian EDM-pop singer-songwriter and producer (Madison Avenue) 
 Kim English, American electronica, soul, gospel, and house music singer (d. 2019)
September 7 – Chad Sexton, drummer (311)
September 8 
 Benny Ibarra, Mexican singer
 Neko Case, American singer-songwriter (K D LANG, case/lang/veirs, The New Pornographers)
September 10
Jeff Marx, American Broadway composer
Ménélik, French rapper
September 14 – Craig Montoya, bassist (Everclear)
September 15 – Jukka Jokikokko, Finnish musician and studio engineer
September 19 – Takanori Nishikawa, singer and actor (T.M. Revolution)
September 23 – Ani DiFranco,  American singer, multi-instrumentalist, poet, songwriter, feminist icon and businesswoman
October 5 – South Park Mexican, Chiacno rapper
October 6 – Amy Jo Johnson, American actress and singer
October 13 – Paul Potts, British tenor
October 15 
 Eric Benét, American singer
 Ginuwine, American singer, songwriter, dancer and actor.
October 21 – Tony Mortimer, British singer (East 17)
October 24 – Jarkko Martikainen, Finnish rock musician
October 27 – Adrian Erlandsson, Swedish drummer
October 31 – Linn Berggren, Swedish musician (Ace of Base)
November 2 – Ely Buendia, Filipino rock lead singer and rhythm guitarist (The Eraserheads)
November 7 – Neil Hannon, Northern Irish musician (The Divine Comedy)
November 9
Susan Tedeschi, American musician and singer
Scarface, American rapper
November 12 – Sarah Harmer, Canadian singer-songwriter and guitarist 
November 15 – Jack Ingram, American singer-songwriter and guitarist
December 1 – Jonathan Coulton, American folk rock singer-songwriter
December 2
Sergei Krylov, violinist
Treach, American rapper (Naughty by Nature)
December 5 - Michel'le, African-American singer
December 6 – Ulf Ekberg, Swedish musician (Ace of Base)
December 9 – Kara DioGuardi, American singer-songwriter, producer, television judge, musician, record producer, music publisher, A&R executive, composer and TV personality
December 14 – Beth Orton, British singer-songwriter
December 16 – Benjamin Kowalewicz, Canadian musician
December 18
DMX, American rapper
Cowboy Troy, American singer and rapper
December 24 – Will Oldham, American musician
December 29 – Aled Jones, Welsh boy soprano, later baritone
 date unknown – Ralph Farris, American violist, violinist, composer, arranger, producer and conductor (ETHEL)

 Deaths 
January 5 – Roberto Gerhard, composer, 73
January 9 – Jani Christou, composer, 44 (car accident)
January 17
 Simon Kovar, bassoonist
 Billy Stewart, scat singer, 32 (car accident)
January 25 – Jane Bathori, opera singer, 92
January 31 – Slim Harpo, blues musician, 46 (heart attack)
February 1 – Blaž Arnič, composer, 69 (car crash)
February 12
Ishmon Bracey, blues musician, 69
Nick Pantas, guitarist (Elf) (car accident)
André Souris, composer and writer, 70
February 19 – Pavel Ludikar, operatic bass, 87
February 20 – Albert Wolff, conductor, 86
March 1 – Lucille Hegamin, blues singer, 75
March 16 – Tammi Terrell, singer, 24 (brain tumor)
April 12 – Kerstin Thorborg, operatic contralto, 73
April 20 – Shakeel Badayuni, songwriter, 53 (diabetes-related)
April 21 – Earl Hooker, blues musician, 41 (tuberculosis)
April 23 – Adeline Genée, ballerina
April 24 – Otis Spann, blues musician, 40 (liver cancer)
April 26 – Gypsy Rose Lee, burlesque entertainer, 59 (cancer)
May 11 – Johnny Hodges, jazz musician, 62 (heart attack)
May 14 – Jack Fina, pianist and bandleader, 56 (heart attack)
May 22 – John Waterhouse, Canadian violinist, conductor, and music educator, 92
May 23 – Nydia Westman, actress and singer
June – Calvin Boze, trumpeter and bandleader
June 11 – Earl Grant, pianist and singer, 39 (car accident)
June 16
Heino Eller, composer and music teacher
Lonnie Johnson, blues and jazz musician
July 7 – Charles Tobias, US songwriter and singer
July 12 – L. Wolfe Gilbert, Russian-born US songwriter
July 13 – Roger Edens, composer and arranger, 64
July 14 – Luis Mariano, singer and actor
July 17 – Stanley Wilson, conductor, arranger and film composer, 54 (heart attack)
July 23 – Leith Stevens, composer, 60 (heart attack)
July 29 – Sir John Barbirolli, conductor and cellist, 70 (heart attack)
July 29 – Jonel Perlea, Romanian conductor, 69
July 30 – George Szell, conductor and composer, 73 (cancer)
July 31 – Booker Ervin, jazz musician, 39 (kidney failure)
August 10 – Bernd Alois Zimmermann, German composer, 52 (suicide)
September 2
Mercedes Llopart, operatic soprano, 75
Kees van Baaren, composer and music teacher, 63
September 3 – Alan Wilson, singer of Canned Heat, 27 (drug overdose)
September 18
 Jimi Hendrix, guitarist and singer, 27 (pulmonary aspiration)
 Maxwell Davis, saxophonist, 54
September 25 – Yefim Golyshev, Ukrainian violinist, painter and composer, 73
October 2 – Bo Linde, Swedish composer, 37
October 4
Janis Joplin, singer, 27 (heroin overdose)
George Frederick McKay, composer, 71
October 13 – Julia Culp, operatic soprano ("the Dutch nightingale"), 90
October 22
 Pauline Donalda, operatic soprano, 88
 Samson François, pianist, 46
October 28 – Baby Huey, singer, 26 (heart attack)
October 31 – Arvid Andersen, violinist, conductor and composer
November 6 – Agustín Lara, composer, 73
November 7 – Eddie Peabody, banjo player, 68
November 19 – Maria Yudina, pianist, 71
November 25 – Albert Ayler, saxophonist and composer, 34
December 19 – Giulia Recli, composer and writer, 80
December 23 – Mimi Benzell, operatic soprano, 46 (cancer)
December 31
 Ray Henderson, songwriter, 74
 Cyril Scott, composer, 91
 date unknown''
Efisio Melis, folk musician
Rokneddin Mokhtari, Iranian violinist

Awards

Grammy Awards 
 Grammy Awards of 1970

Eurovision Song Contest 
 Eurovision Song Contest 1970

References 

 
20th century in music
Music by year